The SC-1 class was a large class of submarine chasers built during World War I for the United States Navy. They were ordered in very large numbers in order to combat attacks by German U-boats, with 442 boats built from 1917 to 1919.

Development
In 1916, the then Assistant Secretary of the Navy, Franklin D. Roosevelt ordered the US Navy to design a small anti-submarine vessel that could be built quickly in small civilian boatyards, as if war came, larger shipyards would be busy building larger warships. Consideration was given to adopting an  wooden Motor Launch built in large numbers by ELCO for the British Royal Navy, but the General Board of the United States Navy thought that these boats were too small to be effective seaboats. The task of designing the new type was given to an experienced designer of small boats, Albert Loring Swasey. He drew up a design for a  wooden boat, emphasizing seaworthiness over speed. At first it was intended to use two  engines, but a shortage of these engines resulted in the design being changed to use three  gasoline engines.

Armament was initially planned to be two  guns, but the aft gun was usually replaced by a depth charge thrower to attack submerged submarines, with two Colt machine guns completing the armament. Many boats were fitted with hydrophones for detecting underwater noises, with either a K-tube fish-type device of  range or SC and MB tubes of  range.

An initial order of 345 SC boats placed in 1917 was planned to be delivered by the end of 1917, with further orders for the French Navy pushing the total ordered up to 448.

Operational history
Deliveries started in July 1917, with deliveries continuing into 1919, with 441 boats built, and the remaining seven boats canceled. One hundred were sold to France, and a further 121 US Navy SC boats were deployed to Europe to operate off Britain and France and in the Mediterranean, where they supported the Otranto Barrage with the remaining US Navy boats operating off the East Coast of the United States.

France lost three SC-boats.

Following the end of the war, four boats (and ) were transferred to Cuba, while 14 boats were transferred to the United States Coast Guard in 1919–1920. Eight of the French SC boats remained in service at the outbreak of World War II. 

In 1920 SC 292 sold commercial becoming Trawler "Chief Seattle", SC 293 becoming Trawler " George L. Harvey", and SC 300 becoming Trawler "Joseph Kildall'.

By December 1941, only 11 boats remained in US Navy service, with two continuing in use until at least April 1945.

Two boats were sold to the Bulgarian Navy and saw action in World War II, sinking one Soviet submarine.

Ships
 List of SC-1-class subchasers (SC-1 to SC-50)
 List of SC-1-class subchasers (SC-51 to SC-100)
 List of SC-1-class subchasers (SC-101 to SC-150)
 List of SC-1-class subchasers (SC-151 to SC-200)
 List of SC-1-class subchasers (SC-201 to SC-250)
 List of SC-1-class subchasers (SC-251 to SC-300)
 List of SC-1-class subchasers (SC-301 to SC-350)
 List of SC-1-class subchasers (SC-351 to SC-400)

See also
 List of patrol vessels of the United States Navy
 Wooden boats of World War II

Footnotes

Notes

Citations

Bibliography
 Friedman, Norman. U.S. Small Combatants. Annapolis, Maryland, USA: Naval Institute Press, 1987. .
 Gardiner, Robert and Randall Gray (eds). Conway's All The World's Fighting Ships 1906–1921. London: Conway Maritime Press, 1985. .
 Gardiner, Robert and Roger Chesneau (eds.) Conway's All The World's Fighting Ships 1922–1946 London: Conway Maritime Press, 1980. .
 Halpern, Paul G. A Naval History of World War I. London: UCL Press, 1995. .
 Halpern, Paul G. The Naval War in the Mediterranean 1914–1918. Annapolis, Maryland, USA: Naval Institute Press, 1987. .
 Moore, John. Jane's Fighting Ships of World War I. London: Studio, 1990. .

External links
 Dictionary of American Naval Fighting Ships (print), v. VI, Appendix 1, "Submarine Chasers (SC)" (General description p. 711-713, list following)
 Subchaser.org

SC-1-class submarine chasers
World War I patrol vessels of the United States
Ship classes of the French Navy